Noble is an unincorporated community in Abington Township in Montgomery County, Pennsylvania, United States. Noble is located at the intersection of Pennsylvania Route 611 (Old York Road) and Baeder Road, north of Jenkintown. The community is served by the Noble station along SEPTA Regional Rail's West Trenton Line. Noble uses the Jenkintown ZIP code of 19046.

References

Unincorporated communities in Montgomery County, Pennsylvania
Unincorporated communities in Pennsylvania